Dmytro Kosynskyy (born 31 March 1989) is a Ukrainian javelin thrower.

He failed a drug test for excess testosterone in June 2011 and was given a two-year ban from the sport.

Achievements

Seasonal bests by year
2008 - 72.61
2009 - 75.18
2010 - 79.53
2011 - 83.39
2014 - 82.28
2015 - 79.00
2016 - 84.08

References

1989 births
Living people
Ukrainian male javelin throwers
Doping cases in athletics
Ukrainian sportspeople in doping cases
Athletes (track and field) at the 2016 Summer Olympics
Olympic athletes of Ukraine